Grace Nakibala is a Ugandan innovator  who is the founder of PedalTap company. She attended  Gayaza High School for her secondary  education after which  she joined the College of Engineering Design Art and Technology (CEDAT) at Makerere University for a Bachelor of science in Architecture.

Professional life
Grace Nakibala is the team leader of the PedalTap innovation, which is a hands-free, foot-operated water-dispensing device designed to reduce the spread of infectious disease and save water. She is also the creator of "EpiTent", a semi-permanent structure used during humanitarian emergencies.

Achievements and honors
Grace Nakibala  has won a number of awards and represented PedalTap at the Next Einstein Forum Global Gathering in 2018
Team lead PedalTap Innovation
Winner of Africa Innovation Challenge in 2017
Winner of the Johnson and Johnson award in March 2017

References

21st-century Ugandan people
21st-century Ugandan women
Living people
Year of birth missing (living people)
Place of birth missing (living people)
Makerere University alumni
People educated at Gayaza High School